The Peter Green Splinter Group were a blues band formed in 1997, fronted by guitarist and singer Peter Green.

Green was the leader of Fleetwood Mac until 1970. He suffered a mental breakdown during the 1970s. He was rehabilitated with the aid of Nigel Watson, Cozy Powell and other friends, and then began touring and recording with the Splinter Group. The group was disbanded in early 2004 with Green's departure from the group – an upcoming tour was cancelled, as was the planned release of a new album.

Band members
 Peter Green – (vocals, lead guitar, slide guitar, harmonica)
 Nigel Watson – (vocals, lead guitar, rhythm guitar)
 Roger Cotton – (piano, Hammond C3, rhythm guitar) (1998–2004)
 Larry Tolfree – (drums, percussion) (1997–2004)
 Pete Stroud – (fretless and fretted bass guitars, double bass) (1998–2004)
Neil Murray – bass guitar (1997–98)
Cozy Powell – drums (1997)
Spike Edney – keyboards (1997)

Discography
Peter Green Splinter Group (1997) Snapper Music SARCD 101
The Robert Johnson Songbook (1998)
Soho Session (1998)
Destiny Road (1999) Snapper Music SMACD 817
Hot Foot Powder (2000)
Time Traders (2001)
Me and the Devil (2001) Snapper Music SMBCD 844 (limited edition box set containing The Robert Johnson Songbook, Hot Foot Powder and a disc of original recordings by Robert Johnson)Blues Don't Change (2001) (Only sold during concerts and via the official website) Reaching the Cold 100 (2003)An Evening With Peter Green Splinter Group In Concert (DVD) (2003) Eagle Vision EV 30045-9 - 21 music tracks plus bonus featuresThe Best of Peter Green Splinter Group (2006 compilation)Blues Don't Change (2006 and 2012) (Re-release)The Very Best of Peter Green Splinter Group'' (2013 compilation – Madfish Music SMACD987)

References

External links
 Peter Green-Fanpage Deutschland/Germany – site not working 20 May 2019.
 

1997 establishments in the United Kingdom
2004 disestablishments in the United Kingdom
British blues musical groups
Musical groups established in 1997
Musical groups disestablished in 2004